Sea Patrol UK was a British television documentary which followed the men and women who keep the English channel open for shipping. The series was produced by Wall To Wall productions in association with the National Geographic Channel.

Premise 
The series followed personnel from numerous agencies (including the Royal Navy, Royal National Lifeboat Institution, Royal Air Force, Customs, and the Coast Guard) with responsibility for monitoring, investigating, and protecting the English Channel.

Episodes

Series 1: 2009

Series 2: 2010
A second series, this time of eight episodes, followed in 2010.

Filming 
The crew interchanged with filming 24 hours a day, different crews film at numerous bases including:
Coast Guard operations room in Warren Apron
Royal Navy Fisheries Protection in Dover harbour
RAF at Chivenor airfield in Devon
The Kent marine police force in Dover Strait
Search And Rescue Portland

International Broadcasts

References 

2009 British television series debuts
2010 British television series endings